Amelia Kajumulo Kavaisi is a retired Professor of Applied Microbiology.

Work
This is a list of some of the various surveys and work done by Kavaisi:

Use of industrial waste 
Food security and entrepreneurship 
Non-green revolution 
Mushroom cultivation soil 
Tanzanian Sector Sector: Investigations and behavior after harvest of mangrove as a biological remedy 
Production of Oxidative and Hydrolytic enzymes by means of Coprinus cinereus (Schaeff). Ashes from manure residue mixed with cow dung 

She is also responsible for providing references and edits to other studies conducted outside Tanzania.

Books
This is a list of various books written by Kavaisi:

Mushroom Plantation in Tanzania

References

Living people
People from Kagera Region
Year of birth missing (living people)
Women microbiologists
Tanzanian scientists
Academic staff of the University of Dar es Salaam